Andrea Beccari (born 12 June 1978 in Moncalieri, Turin) is an Italian freestyle swimmer. He won several medals mainly as member of the Italian 4 × 200 m freestyle relay. He participated for Italy in the Summer Olympic of Sydney 2000 and Athens 2004.

See also
 Swimming at the 2004 Summer Olympics – Men's 200 metre freestyle
 Italy at the 2000 Summer Olympics
 2001 World Aquatics Championships
 Swimming at the 2003 Summer Universiade

References
 Andrea Beccari on agendadiana.com
 Andrea Beccari on Italian Swimming Federation's website

1978 births
Living people
People from Moncalieri
Italian male swimmers
Olympic swimmers of Italy
Swimmers at the 2000 Summer Olympics
Swimmers at the 2004 Summer Olympics
Italian male freestyle swimmers
World Aquatics Championships medalists in swimming
Universiade medalists in swimming
Universiade gold medalists for Italy
Universiade bronze medalists for Italy
Medalists at the 2003 Summer Universiade
Sportspeople from the Metropolitan City of Turin
21st-century Italian people